Myanmar (also known as Burma) is an ethnically diverse nation with 135 distinct ethnic groups officially recognised by the Burmese Government. These are grouped into eight "major national ethnic races":
 Bamar
 Chin
 Kachin
 Karen
 Kayah
 Mon
 Rakhine
 Shan

The "major national ethnic races" are grouped primarily according to region rather than linguistic or ethnic affiliation, as for example the Shan Major National Ethnic Race includes 33 ethnic groups speaking languages in at least four widely differing language families.

Many unrecognised ethnic groups exist, the largest being the Burmese Chinese and Panthay (who together form 3% of the population), Burmese Indians (who form 2% of the population), Rohingya, Anglo-Burmese and Gurkha. There are no official statistics regarding the population of the latter two groups, although unofficial estimates place around 52,000 Anglo-Burmese in Burma with around 1.6 million outside the country.

Officially recognized ethnic groups

Note: The list is very controversial. Many of the names and spelling variants are known only from this list.

Kachin comprises 12 different ethnic groups
1. Kachin see: Jingpo people
2. Tarone see: Taron people
3. Dalaung, unknown
4. Jinghpaw see: Singpho people
5. Guari, unknown
6. Hkahku see: Jingpo people
7. Duleng, unknown
8. Maru (Lawgore)
9. Rawang see Nung Rawang
10. Lashi (La Chit)
11. Atsi see Zaiwa language
12. Lisu

Kayah comprises 9 different ethnic groups
Note, a known questionable source.
13. Kayah (Karenni)
14. Zayein (Lahta; Gaungto; Loilong Karens)
15. Ka-Yun (Kayan; Padaung)
16. Gheko (Karen, Geko)
17. Kebar, maybe translation error for Geba Karen language
18. Bre (Ka-Yaw; Kayaw)
19. Manu Manaw (Manumanaw)
20. Yin Talai, maybe Yintale
21. Yin Baw (Yinbaw)

Kayin comprises 11 different ethnic groups
22. Karen (Kayin)
23. Kayinpyu (Geba Karen)
24. Pa-Le-Chi, maybe Mobwa
25. Mon Kayin (Sarpyu), unknown
26. Sgaw (Karen, S’gaw)
27. Ta-Lay-Pwa, unknown
28. Paku (Karen, Paku)
29. Bwe (Bwe Karen)
30. Monnepwa (Karen, Paku)
31. Monpwa, unknown
32. Shu (Pwo Kayin)

Chin comprises 53 different ethnic groups
Possibly originally a list of tax rate districts. With the highest tax first.
33. Chin
34. Meithei (Meitei; Kathe)
 Pangal
35. Saline (ethnic group)
36. Ka-Lin-Kaw people (Lushay)
37. Khumi (Khami)
38. Mro-Khimi people 
39. Khawno
40. Kaungso
41. Kaung Saing Chin
42. Kwelshin (Khualsim)
43. Kwangli (Sim)
44. Gunte people (Lyente; Falam)
45. Gwete (Guite)
46. Ngorn (Chin, Ngawn)
47. Siyin (Sizaang), (Sizang)
48. Sentang
49. Saing Zan
50. Za-How (Zahau)
51. Zotung
52. Zo-Pe
53. Zo
54. Zanniat (Zanniet)
55. Tapong
56. Tiddim (Hai-Dim)
57. Tay-Zan
58. Taishon (Tashon)
59. Thado
60. Torr people (Tawr)
61. Dim
62. Dai (Yindu)
63. Naga
64. Tangkhul
65. Malin
66. Panun
67. Magun
68. Matu
69. Miram (Mara, Shendu, Lakher, etc.)
70. Mi-er
71. Mgan
72. Lushei, a clan of the Mizos (Lushay) 
73. Laymyo
74. Lyente
75. Lautu
76. Lai (Haka Chin)
77. Laizao
78. Mro (Wakim)
79. Hualngo
80. Anu
81. Anun
82. Oo-Pu
83. Lhinbu
84. Asho (Plain)
85. Rongtu

Burman comprises 9 ethnic groups
86. Burman (Bamar)
87. Dawei of Dawei city
88. Beik
89. Yaw
90. Yabein
91. Kadu (Kado)
92. Ganan
93. Salone (Salon; Moken)
94. Hpon

Mon comprises 1 ethnic group
95. Mon

Rakhine comprises 7 ethnic groups
96. Rakhine (Arakanese)
97. Kamein
98. Khami
99. Daingnet
100. Maramagyi
101. Mro people (Awa Khami)
102. Thet

Shan comprises 33 ethnic groups
103. Shan (Tai)
104. Yun (Lao)
105. Kwi
106. Pyin
107. Yao (Hmong; Mien)
108. Danaw (Danau)
109. Pale
110. Eng (En)
111. Son
112. Khamu (Khmu)
113. Kaw (Akha-E-Kaw)
114. Kokant (Kokang)
115. Khamti Shan
116. Hkun (Khün)
117. Taungyo
118. Danu
119. Palaung
120. Man Zi
121. Yin Kya
122. Yin Net
123. Shan Gale
124. Shan Gyi
125. Lahu
126. Intha
127. Eik-swair
128. Pa-O (Taungthu; Black Karen)
129. Tai-Loi
130. Tai-Leng (Red Shan)
131. Tai-Lon
132. Tai-Lay
133. Maingtha (Achang)
134. Maw Shan
135. Wa (Va)

List grouped by language family
Sino-Tibetan
 Chinese
 Kokang (Mandarin Chinese dialect; sometimes spelled Kokant)
 Tibeto-Burman
 Burman (Bamar)
 Anu
 Asho (Plain)
 Atsi
 Beik
 Bwe
 Chin
 Dalaung
 Danu
 Dawei
 Dim
 Duleng
 Ganan
 Gheko
 Gunte (Lyente)
 Haulngo
 Hpon
 Intha
 Kachin (Jingpo)
 Kadu (Kado)
 Karen (Kayin)
 Kaw (Akha-E-Kaw, Akha)
 Kayinpyu (Geba Karen)
 Khams Tibetan
 Kwelshin
 Lahu
Lai (Haka Chin)
Laizo
 Lashi (La Chit)
 Lisu
 Lyente
 Maingtha
 Marma
 Maru (Lawgore)
 Meitei/Pangal (also spelled Meithei or Kathe)
 Miram (Mara)
 Monnepwa
 Mro (Wakim)
 Naga
 Pa-O
 Pyin
 Rakhine (Arakanese)
 Rawang
 Sgaw
 Shu (Pwo)
 Taron
 Taungyo
 Thet
 Tiddim (Hai-Dim)
 Torr (also spelled Tawr)
 Yaw
 Zo
Zophei
Zotung

Tai–Kadai
 Tai
 Shan
 Hkun (also spelled Khün)
 Khamti Shan
 Thai

Hmong–Mien
 Yao

Austroasiatic
 Mon–Khmer
 Mon
 Danaw (also spelled Danau)
 Khmu (Khamu)
 Tai-Loi
 Wa (Va)
 Palaung
 Pale

Austronesian
 Malayo-Polynesian
 Malay
 Moken (also spelled Salon or Salone)

Indo-European
 Indo-Aryan
 Daignet people
 Kamein
 Maramagyi

Unrecognised ethnic groups
The Government of Myanmar (Burma) does not recognise several ethnic groups as being among the list of 135 officially recognised ethnic groups:
 Anglo-Burmese people
 Burmese Chinese
 Panthay
 Burmese Indians
 Taungtha people
 Rohingya people
 Burmese gorkhas/Nepalese
 Mizo people
 Jews
 Bamar Muslims (Pathi)

Language ISO 639-3 codes
Note: This is a list of is languages, and the name of a language are not always the same as the name of an ethnic group.

 Achang [acn]
 Akeu [aeu]
 Akha [ahk]
 Anal [anm]
 Anong [nun]
 Blang [blr]
 Burmese [mya]
 Chak [ckh]
 Chakma [ccp]
 Chin:
 Chin, Anu-Hkongso [anl]
 Chin, Asho [csh]
 Chin, Bawm [bgr]
 Chin, Bualkhaw [cbl]
 Chin, Chinbon [cnb]
 Chin, Daai [dao]
 Chin, Dim [ctd]
 Chin, Eastern Khumi [cek]
 Chin, Falam [cfm]
 Chin, Haka [cnh]
 Chin, Kaang [ckn]
 Chin, Khumi [cnk]
 Chin, Laitu [clj]
 Chin, Lautu [clt]
 Chin, Mara [mrh]
 Chin, Matu [hlt]
 Chin, Mizo [lus]
 Chin, Mro-Khimi [cmr]
 Chin, Müün [mwq]
 Chin, Ngawn [cnw]
 Chin, Rawngtu [weu]
 Chin, Rungtu [rtc]
 Chin, Senthang [sez]
 Chin, Siyin [csy]
 Chin, Songlai [csj]
 Chin, Sumtu [csv]
 Chin, Tawr [tcp]
 Chin, Tedim [ctd]
 Chin, Thado [tcz]
 Chin, Thaiphum [cth]
 Chin, Zotung [czt]
 Chin, Zyphe [zyp]
 Chin, Zanniat language
 Chinese:
 Chinese, Mandarin [cmn]
 Danau [dnu]
 Danu [dnv]
 Drung [duu]
 Hmong Njua [hnj]
 Hpon [hpo]
 Intha [int]
 Jingpho [kac]
 Kadu [zkd]
 Kanan [zkn]
 Karen:
 Karen, Bwe [bwe]
 Karen, Geba [kvq]
 Karen, Geko [ghk]
 Karen, Mobwa [jkm]
 Karen, Paku [jkp]
 Karen, Pwo Eastern [kjp]
 Karen, Pwo Western [pwo]
 Karen, S’gaw [ksw]
 Kayah:
 Kayah, Eastern [eky]
 Kayah, Western [kyu]
 Kedah Malay [meo]
 Kayan [pdu]
 Kayaw [kvl]
 Khamti [kht]
 Khün [kkh]
 Lahta [kvt]
 Lahu [lhu]
 Lahu Shi [lhi]
 Lashi [lsi]
 Lhao Vo [mhx]
 Lisu [lis]
 Lü [khb]
 Manumanaw [kxf]
 Moken [mwt]
 Mon [mnw]
 Mru [mro]
 Naga:
 Naga, Akyaung Ari [nqy]
 Naga, Khiamniungan [kix]
 Naga, Koki [nxk]
 Naga, Konyak [nbe]
 Naga, Kyan-Karyaw [nqq]
 Naga, Lao [nlq]
 Naga, Leinong [lzn]
 Naga, Long Phuri [lpn]
 Naga, Makuri [jmn]
 Naga, Makyan [umn]
 Naga, Para [pzn]
 Naga, Ponyo-Gongwang [npg]
 Naga, Tangkhul [ntx]
 Naga, Tase [nst]
 Nusu [nuf]
 Palaung:
 Palaung, Ruching [pce]
 Palaung, Rumai [rbb]
 Palaung, Shwe [pll]
 Pali [pli]
 Pa’o [blk]
 Pyen [pyy]
 Rakhine [rki]
 Rawang [raw]
 Riang [ril]
 Samtao [stu]
 Shan [shn]
 Tai Laing [tjl]
 Tai Loi [tlq]
 Tai Nüa [tdd]
 Taman [tcl]
 Taungyo [tobacco]
 Tavoyan [tvn]
 Tibetan:
 Tibetan, Khams [khg]
 Wa:
 Wa, Parauk [prk]
 Wewaw [wea]
 Yinbaw [kvu]
 Yinchia [yin]
 Yintale [yin]
 Zaiwa [atb]
 Zayein [kxk]
 Zo [zom]

Thaungtha is similar with rabain

See also

References

External links
 List of ethnic groups in Myanmar - Myanmar Ministry of Hotels and Tourism
 Ethnologue page for Burma languages
 Minorities in Burma and Burma: Time for Change by Minority Rights Group International

Books
 U Min Naing, National Ethnic Groups of Myanmar (Trans. by Hpone Thant).
Yangon: Thein Myint Win Press, 2000.
 "National Races of Myanmar" (1960) by the Ministry of Culture

Ethnic groups in Myanmar
Burma